Lake Karachi is an endorheic saltwater lake in Chanovsky District of Novosibirsk Oblast, Russia. Karachi has a surface area of 2,9 km2 (1.1 sq mi).

The lake and its surroundings are located in a protected area.

Gallery

References

Karachi
Karachi